The Brown River is a short river of New Zealand. It flows northwest to meet the Poerua River five kilometres southeast of Lake Brunner.

See also
List of rivers of New Zealand

References

Rivers of the West Coast, New Zealand
Rivers of New Zealand